Atalaya is a Spanish municipality in the province of Badajoz, Extremadura. It has a population of 339 (2007) and an area of 22.7 km².

References

Municipalities in the Province of Badajoz